This is a list of textile artists who were born in Scandinavia (including Finland), or whose artworks are closely associated with that region.

The countries of Scandinavia have a long history of textile art, especially Sweden and Denmark. For centuries, country women created their own fabrics with designs which were often inspired by nature. By the early 20th century, artists became famous for their pile rugs while after the Second World War brightly coloured Scandinavian textile designs became popular across Europe and in the United States.

A 
Gudrun Stig Aagaard (1895–1986), Danish textile artist
Louise Adelborg (1885–1971), Swedish porcelain designer and textile artist
Maria Adelborg (1849–1940), Swedish textile artist
Lis Ahlmann (1894–1979), Danish weaver and textile designer
Synnøve Anker Aurdal (1908–2000), Norwegian textile artist
Maja Andersson Wirde (1873–1952), Swedish textile artist
Astrid Andreasen (born 1948), Faroese textile and graphic artist

B 

Gerda Bengtsson (1900–1995), Danish textile artist
Elisabeth Bergstrand-Poulsen (1887–1955), Swedish writer, painter and textile artist
Johanne Bindesbøll (1851–1934), Danish textile artist
Anna Boberg (1864–1935), Swedish painter, ceramist, textile artist
Anna Sofie Boesen Dreijer (1899–1986), textile artist specializing in dance costumes
Agnes Branting (1862–1930), Swedish textile artist
Johanna Brunsson (1846–1920), Swedish textile artist and educator

C 
Bodil Cappelen (born 1930), Norwegian painter, textile artist and illustrator
Anna Casparsson (1861–1961), Swedish textile artist, embroiderer
Anna Christina Cronquist (1807–1893), Swedish weaver and entrepreneur

D 

Ingrid Dessau (1923–2000), Swedish textile artist
Margrete Drejer (1889–1975), Danish textile artist
Brita Drewsen (1887–1983), Swedish textile artist active in Denmark

E 
Fredrika Eleonora von Düben (1738–1808), Swedish textile artist
Annika Ekdahl (born 1955), Swedish textile artist
Merete Erbou Laurent (born 1949), Danish weaver and textile artist
Lisa Erlandsdotter (1774–1854), Swedish tapestry maker
Bengta Eskilsson (1836–1923), Swedish textile artist
Ulla Eson Bodin (1935–2009), Swedish textile artist and designer

F 
Emy Fick (1876–1959), Swedish textile artist and businesswoman
Pauline Fjelde (1861–1923), Norwegian-American painter and textile artist
Helga Foght (1902–1974), Danish textile artist
Elisabeth Forsell (fl. 1740s), Swedish weaver
Einar Forseth (1892–1988), Swedish mosaic and textile artist

G 

Märtha Gahn (1881–1973), Swedish textile artist
Sophia Magdalena Gardelius (1804–1881), Swedish weaver
Esther Gehlin (1892–1949), Danish-Swedish painter and textile artist
Sofia Gisberg (1824–1926), textile artist, sculptor and educator
Elisabeth Glantzberg (1873–1951), Swedish textile artist
Thyra Grafström (1864–1925), Swedish textile artist
Viola Gråsten (1910–1994), Swedish-Finnish textile designer
Ulrikke Greve (1868–1951), Norwegian textile artist

H 

Elisabeth Haarr (born 1945), Norwegian textile artist
Margrethe Hald (1897–1982), Danish textile researcher
Bente Hammer (born 1950), Danish textile artist and fashion designer
Frida Hansen (1855–1931), Norwegian textile artist
Gerda Henning (1891–1951), Danish weaver and textile designer
Helena Hietanen (born 1963), Finnish textile artist
Berit Hjelholt (1920–2016), Finnish-born Danish textile artist
Astrid Holm (1876–1937), Danish painter and textile artist
Rose-Marie Huuva (born 1943), Swedish textile artist, poet

I 
Kirsti Ilvessalo (1920–2019), Finnish textile artist

J 

Emma Jacobsson (1883–1977), Austrian-born Swedish textile designer and entrepreneur
Else Marie Jakobsen (1927–2012), Norwegian designer, textile artist
Raija Jokinen (born 1960), Finnish artist and textile designer

K 
Bodil Kaalund (1930–2016), Danish painter, textile artist, church decorator
Brita-Kajsa Karlsdotter (1816–1915), Swedish textile artist
Vibeke Klint (1927–2019), Danish textile artist
Kristiane Konstantin-Hansen (1848–1925), Danish textile artist
Ann-Mari Kornerup (1918–2006), Swedish-Danish textile artist
Holcha Krake (1885–1944), Swedish textile artist
Hans Krondahl (1929–2018), Swedish painter and textile artist
Thora Kulle (1849–1939), Swedish textile artist and businesswoman

L 
Jenny la Cour (1849–1928), Danish textile artist and educator
Gunilla Lagerbielke (1926–2013), Swedish textile artist
Marie Gudme Leth (1895–1997), Danish textile designer pioneering screen printing

M 

Märta Måås-Fjetterström (1873–1941), Swedish textile artist
Britta Marakatt-Labba (born 1951), Swedish Sámi textile artist
Kaisa Melanton (1920–2012), Swedish textile artist
Ulrika Melin (1767–1834), Swedish textile artist

N 

Martin Nannestad Jørgensen (born 1959), visual artist working mainly with textiles
Kim Naver (born 1940), Danish designer and textile artist
Elna M. de Neergaard (1872-1946), Danish-American weaver and occupational therapist
Barbro Nilsson (1899–1983), Swedish textile artist
Ernestine Nyrop (1888–1975), textile artist and fresco painter

O 
Maria Elisabet Öberg (1734–1808), Finnish weaver and textile artist
Cilluf Olsson (1847–1916), Swedish textile artist
Agda Österberg (1891–1987), Swedish textile artist

P 

Else Poulsson (1909–2002), Norwegian painter, textile artist

R 
Franka Rasmussen (1907–1994), German-born Danish textile artist
Marianne Richter (1916–2010), Swedish textile artist
Maria Rønning (1741–1807), Norwegian-Faroese weaver
Hannah Ryggen (1894–1970), Swedish-Norwegian textile artist

S 

Loja Saarinen (1879–1968), Finnish-American textile artist
Naja Salto (1945–2016), Danish textile artist
Anna Sarauw (1839–1919), Danish textile artist
Bente Sætrang (born 1846), Danish textile artist
Brigitta Scherzenfeldt (1684–1736), Swedish writer and weaving teacher
Anna Maria Schmilau (died 1725), Swedish tapestry artist
Anna Brita Sergel (1733–1819), Swedish textile artist
Maja Sjöström )1868–1961), Swedish textile artist
Georgia Skovgaard (1828–1868), Danish embroiderer
Grethe Sørensen (born 1947), Danish textile artist
Wendela Gustafva Sparre (1772–1855), Swedish textile artist
Dagmar Starcke (1899–1975), Danish textile artist
Ulla Stenberg (1792–1858), Swedish textile artist
Gustava Johanna Stenborg (1776–1819), Swedish textile artist
Gudrun Stig Aagaard (1895–1986), Danish textile designer 
Marianne Strengell (1909–1998), Finnish-American textile designer
Júlíana Sveinsdóttir (1889–1966), early Icelandic female painter, textile artist
Sigrid Synnergren (1894–1986), Swedish textile artist

T 
Jette Thyssen (born 1933), Danish textile artist
Paula Trock (1889–1979), Danish weaver, textile artist

U 
Hedvig Ulfsparre, (1877–1963), Swedish textile collector
Lin Utzon (born 1946), Danish ceramist, textile artist

V 
Hanne Vedel (born 1933), Danish weaver

W 

Clara Wæver (1855–1930), Danish embroiderer
Gertie Wandel (1894–1988), Danish textile artist
Lise Warburg (born 1932), Danish textile artist and writer
Carin Wästberg (1859–1942), Swedish textile artist
Maria Widebeck (1858–1929), Swedish textile artist
Ida Winckler (1907–1995), Danish textile artist, specializing in embroidery
Hanna Winge (1838–1896), Swedish painter and textile artist

Z 
Margaretha Zetterberg (1773–1803), Finnish textile and crafts artist
Lilli Zickerman (1858–1949), Swedish textile artist

References

Danish textile artists
Finnish textile artists
Norwegian textile designers
Swedish textile artists
Textile arts by region
Textile artists
Lists of artists
textile artists
Scandinavian culture